Auguste Honoré Charlois (November 26, 1864 – March 26, 1910) was a French astronomer who discovered 99 asteroids while working at the Nice Observatory in southeastern France.

Asteroid Discovery
His first discovery was the asteroid 267 Tirza in 1887. He photographed 433 Eros on the very night of its discovery by Gustav Witt, but was not able to act quickly enough before Witt announced his find.

Although he started searching for asteroids in the era of visual detection, by 1891 Max Wolf had pioneered the use of astrophotography to drastically speed up the rate of detection of asteroids, and both Wolf and Charlois separately discovered far more asteroids than would have been feasible by visual detection. In 1899, Charlois received the Prix Jules Janssen, the highest award of the Société astronomique de France, the French astronomical society, and was also awarded the Valz Prize by the French Academy of Sciences in 1889 for his work on calculating asteroid orbits.

Murder
At the age of 45, he was murdered by Gabriel Brengues, the brother of his first wife, Jeanne Charlois and husband to the sister (Therese) of his second wife, Marie Brengues, over an inheritance by the death of Jeanne (née Brengues). The man was found guilty and given a life sentence of hard labor in New Caledonia.

Memorial
The asteroid 1510 Charlois, discovered by André Patry at Nice Observatory in 1939, was named in his honour.

List of discovered minor planets

References

External links 
 Laureats of the Prix Jules Janssen (1897–1979)

1864 births
1910 deaths
19th-century French astronomers
Discoverers of asteroids
French murder victims
Male murder victims
People murdered in France
20th-century French astronomers
1910 murders in France